Red sparrow may refer to:

 Red fox sparrow (Passerella iliaca iliaca), a group of subspecies of the North American fox sparrow
 Red Sparrow (novel), a 2013 U.S. spy novel by Jason Matthews
 Red Sparrow, a 2018 U.S. spy film based on the eponymous novel
 Red Sparowes, a U.S. post-rock band
 Red Sparrow, a fictional character created by Charles Bukowski from the 1994 novel Pulp
 Red Sparrow, a 2010 play by Manav Kaul

See also
 Red (disambiguation)
 Sparrow (disambiguation)